Portsmouth Olde Towne Historic District, is a national historic district located at Portsmouth, Virginia. It encompasses 89 buildings.  It is located in the primarily residential section of Portsmouth and includes a notable collection of Federal and Greek Revival style townhouses, known as "basement houses."  Other notable buildings include the Watts House (1799), Grice-Neeley House (circa 1820), Ball-Nivison House (1752), Emanuel African Methodist Episcopal Church (1857), St. John's Episcopal Church (1898), Court Street Baptist Church (1901-1903), and Union Machinist Home.  Located in the district is the separately listed Monumental Methodist Church.

It was listed on the National Register of Historic Places in 1970, with a boundary increase in 1983.

References

Historic districts on the National Register of Historic Places in Virginia
Federal architecture in Virginia
Greek Revival architecture in Virginia
Queen Anne architecture in Virginia
Victorian architecture in Virginia
Buildings and structures in Portsmouth, Virginia
National Register of Historic Places in Portsmouth, Virginia